These are the official results of the 2022 Ibero-American Championships in Athletics which took place on May 20, 21 and 22, 2022, at the Estadi Olímpic Camilo Cano in La Nucía, Spain, except for the half marathon which was held in Torrevella, Spain.

Men's results

100 meters

Heats – May 20Wind:Heat 1: +0.5 m/s, Heat 2: +1.4 m/s, Heat 3: +2.2 m/s

Final – May 20Wind: +0.1 m/s

200 meters

Heats – May 21Wind:Heat 1: -0.8 m/s, Heat 2: -0.3 m/s

Final – May 22Wind: -2.1 m/s

400 meters

Heats – May 20

Final – May 21

800 meters

Heats – May 20

Final – May 22

1500 metres
May 22

5000 metres
May 22

Half marathon
May 22

110 meters hurdles

Heats – May 21Wind:Heat 1: -0.9 m/s, Heat 2: -1.0 m/s

Final – May 22Wind: +0.3 m/s

400 meters hurdles

Heats – May 20

Final – May 21

3000 meters steeplechase
May 20

4 × 100 meters relay
May 21

4 × 400 meters relay
May 22

10,000 metres walk
May 21

High jump
May 21

Pole vault
May 21

Long jump
May 20

Triple jump
May 21

Shot put
May 22

Discus throw
May 21

Hammer throw
May 20

Javelin throw
May 22

Decathlon
May 20–21

Women's results

100 meters

Heats – May 20Wind:Heat 1: +1.1 m/s, Heat 2: +1.7 m/s

Final – May 20Wind: -0.2 m/s

200 meters

Heats – May 21Wind:Heat 1: -0.4 m/s, Heat 2: -2.2 m/s

Final – May 22Wind: -2.5 m/s

400 meters

Heats – May 20

Final – May 21

800 meters

Heats – May 20

Final – May 22

1500 meters
May 21

5000 meters
May 22

Half marathon
May 22

100 meters hurdles
May 22Wind: +0.5 m/s

400 meters hurdles

Heats – May 20

Final – May 21

3000 meters steeplechase
May 21

4 × 100 meters relay
May 21

4 × 400 meters relay
May 22

10,000 metres walk
May 21

High jump
May 22

Pole vault
May 20

Long jump
May 20

Triple jump
May 22

Shot put
May 21

Discus throw
May 22

Hammer throw
May 21

Javelin throw
May 20

Heptathlon
May 20–21

References

Ibero-American Championships Results
Events at the Ibero-American Championships in Athletics